The 6th Infantry Division (6de Infanterie Divisie) was an infantry division of the Belgian Army that existed during the Battle of Belgium during the Second World War.

History

World War I 

At the start of World War I, the 6th Infantry Division was one of the original 7 Divisions, and was called ‘6th Division.’ Its headquarters are in Brussels and the division composed of the 18th, 19th, and 20th Mixed Brigades, which were organized from Grenadier and Carabiner units. They also had in their command the 1st Chasseurs Regiment. The divisional commander is Latonnois van Rode.

World War II 

As one of the stronger Belgian Divisions - its three regiments were all part of the active standing army - the Division was assigned a large portion of the Albert Canal line at the outbreak of the war. It covered the 14,5 km between Beringen and Eindhout (Geel). To that end, it received temporarily additional fire support from the 2nd, 4th and 16nd regiments of artillery.

At 10 May, the Division saw retreating troops from the 11th division and covering cavalry units passing through its line, some already showing damage of Luftwaffe bombings. Apart from some strafing by German planes, the 6th was never seriously tested in its strong positions. The breakthrough at Eben-Emael necessitated an early retreat to the main line of resistance of the K-W Line. After a while, the 1st Carabiniers were summoned back to the Albert Canal to cover the general retreat alongside units of Group Ninitte and the Cavalry Division.

As they advanced to the Canal, the Carabiniers discovered the Germans had already crossed the Canal at Kwaadmechelen. After some fighting and mortar duels the regiment was summoned to fall back to the K-W Line as well.

By the 15th the division was in position around Koningshooikt fortress. Apart from some skirmishes by patrols and armored vehicles, there were no major clashes until the order for a second retreat towards the Canal of Ghent-Terneuzen was given. There no prepared lines were available, so trenches had to be dug as soon as possible. By the 20th the first German patrols arrived, followed by artillery shelling. At the sector of the 1st Carabiniers, attempts to cross the canals were repulsed.

When the Germans reached the English channel, a third and final retreat was ordered, this time to a small canal near the Lys river. Again, hasty entrenchments had to be constructed while the enemy followed close by. Its original position was to be the section between Balgerhoeke and Strobrugge. But after the German breakthrough around Kortrijk, two of its regiments were summoned to plug the hole and take up position around Roeselare for a desperate last stand.
 
The 1st Grenadiers and 9th Line saw particular heavy fighting the 27th of may, when they fended of two major attacks thanks to the effective deployment of mortars, artillery and T-13 tank destroyers. By the end of the day the Grenadiers only needed to conduct a tactical retreat.

The 1st Carabiniers were the last to remain at the canal, where under heavy artillery fire they witnessed the crumbling of the 7th and the 23th on its north. The Germans used prisoners as living shields to approach the lines of the 1st, but without success. As it became clear the bridgeheads to its north could not be contained, its remaining units withdrew to Maldegem where they tried a last stand before the surrender of the army. As the final breakthrough on 27 May could not be contained, the regiment slowly disintegrated.

At least 225 officers, NCO and enlisted were killed in action.

Organization

1940 
Structure of the division at the eve of the Battle of Belgium:

 Headquarters, at Diest
 Commanding Officer, 6th Division - Major General Emile Janssens
1st Grenadier Regiment
1st Carabinier Regiment
9th Line Regiment
6th Artillery Regiment
 6th Bicycle Squadron 
 7th Engineer Battalion
 6th Signal Battalion
 1st Divisional Anti-Tank Gun Company (lorried)
 2nd Divisional Anti-Tank Gun Company (lorried) - to 17th Infantry Division
 6th Divisional Supply Battalion
 6th Divisional Field Hospital Battalion
 6th Divisional Quartermasters Company
 6th Divisional Military Police Unit

See also 
 Belgian Army order of battle (1940)

References 

Infantry divisions of Belgium
Infantry divisions of Belgium in World War II
Military units and formations disestablished in the 1940s